Anthony William Grande (January 11, 1943 – August 9, 2006) was a politician in Ontario, Canada. He served in the Legislative Assembly of Ontario from 1975 to 1987, as a member of the New Democratic Party who represented the Toronto riding of Oakwood.

Background
Grande was born in Calabria, Italy, and moved to Canada with his family at age eleven.  He was educated at the University of Toronto, Lakeshore Teacher's College and the Ontario Institute for Studies in Education, and worked as a teacher with the Toronto District School Board. Prior to his election, he was teacher liaison chair for the New Democratic Party.

In 1974 he married Helen Schlanger. They had three children: Aaron David (1977), Daniel Robert (1979) and Laura Simone (1983). He died of cancer on August 9, 2006, following a four-year illness.

Politics
Grande was elected to the Ontario legislature in the 1975 provincial election, and re-elected in 1977, 1981 and 1985. He served as NDP education critic in the early 1980s, and was reassigned as critic for citizenship, culture and special issues of education in 1983.

Grande supported Bob Rae's successful campaign for the NDP leadership in 1982, and was subsequently asked to relinquish his seat to allow Rae to run for a position in the legislature.  He declined, arguing that the local Italian community in his riding would be upset if he were forced to resign in favour of a non-Italian.

Grande was a strong advocate for multiculturalism and multicultural services during his time. He supported minority language rights in education, and in 1986 he introduced a Private Member's Bill that would have made it easier for students to be taught in languages other than English or French.  The bill died on the order paper when a new election was called in 1987.  Grande was also an advocate for labour, and successfully represented three workers from a North York, Ontario factory before the Ontario Labour Relations Board in 1979-80.  He also supported the rights of tenants, and promoted legislation to permit persons over sixteen years of age to gain access to their medical records.

The Progressive Conservative Party, which had governed Ontario since 1943, was reduced to a minority government in the 1985 election. After the election, the NDP provided outside support to allow the Liberal Party to form a new administration. The Liberal government was still popular in office after two years, and won a landslide majority government in the 1987 election. Grande lost his seat to Liberal star candidate Chaviva Hošek, and worked as a health and safety officer after leaving office.

He campaigned for Mayor of York in 1988, describing the city's government as a "family compact" and promising to fight for an increased share of Metropolitan Toronto's tax base.  He lost to moderate Tory candidate Fergy Brown.

Electoral Record

All provincial election information is taken from Elections Ontario.

References

External links
 

1943 births
2006 deaths
Italian emigrants to Canada
Ontario New Democratic Party MPPs
People from Calabria
People from York, Toronto
Deaths from cancer in Ontario